Xhavit Shyqyri Demneri (1919 — 10 November 1996) was an Albanian football player.

Xhavit Shyqyri Demneri Street, a street in Tirana, the capital of Albania, is named in his honor.

Playing career

Club
He was born in Tirana, and was heavily involved in Albanian football by the late 1930s.  He was active with Sport Club Rinia, Sport Club Tirana and Shprefeja. He played defense.

He was among the first to gather with Besim Fagu and Jani Leka to start the establishment of Partizani sports club at the end of 1945, also serving as coach of the football team. He was forced to retire as a player due to a knee injury. Demneri was also a member of the 1947 Partizani championship team.

International
He made his debut for Albania in an October 1946 Balkan Cup match against Yugoslavia, his sole cap.

Managerial career
He is best remembered as a coach and trainer.

Honours
Albanian Superliga: 1
 1947

References

1919 births
1996 deaths
Footballers from Tirana
Albanian footballers
Association football defenders
KF Tirana players
Shprefeja players
FK Partizani Tirana players
Albanian football managers
KF Tirana managers
Albania international footballers